Ribbed Music for the Numb Generation is the debut studio album by English electronic music band Sohodolls, released on 24 September 2007 by Filthy Pretty Records. The album was produced by Robert Harder (Babyshambles, the Sunshine Underground), with additional production by Steve Lyon (Depeche Mode, the Cure) and Harry Smith.

The songs "Stripper" and "I'm Not Cool" were used in seasons one and two of the American television series Gossip Girl, respectively. "Stripper" was also used in the ITV2 advert for the show's first season. "My Vampire" was used in the fifth season finale of the American drama series Nip/Tuck.

The album's name is a play on Music for the Jilted Generation, the second studio album by the Prodigy.

Critical reception

Ribbed Music for the Numb Generation was well received by music critics. Jenni Cole of musicOMH described the album as "dark electro-glam of a lushness not heard since the synthtastic early '80s", comparing the band favourably to the Human League, Depeche Mode, Heaven 17 and Soft Cell. Cole added that "the music is brilliant. Upbeat, disco-tinged without being cheesy, taking all the best parts from glam and adding them to a Gothy, new century cabaret chic that no doubt translates brilliantly into live performance." Susan Frances of AbsolutePunk commented that the album "wraps you in fishnets of cabaret-styled vocals from lead singer Maya Von Doll and techno-dripping rhythms orchestrated by drummer Paul Stone and bassist Matt Lord. The barbed guitar riffs of Toni Sailor are perched in thickets of bristling keyboards from Weston Doll creating movements that expand and separate with a will of their own, alternating lean segments with thick froths while covered in Maya's femininely sweet vocal reams." She added that the music is "both street savvy and club chic, keeping away from falling into a mundane routine that often plagues synth-pop albums."

Chris Reynolds of Gigwise viewed Sohodolls as "a sleazy yet chic outfit comparable to Goldfrapp" and wrote that "Maya's vocals are seductive and the bass and synths are as smooth as can be", but felt that "the lack of variation ... detracts greatest from a fine debut. When stripped down this is simple pop music with an eighties edge and can become tiresome at points such as the lacklustre 'Trash the Rental'." Emily Kate Stephens of MyVillage concluded, "With a huge mix of influences Sohodolls travel through this album with a strength and grace that means you can't help but listen. They can look forwarded to awakening their followers' senses. From the first listen the album makes you want to catch their next gig."

Track listing

Personnel
Credits adapted from the liner notes of Ribbed Music for the Numb Generation.

Sohodolls
 Sohodolls – production 
 Maya von Doll – vocals
 Weston Doll – keyboards
 Matt Lord – bass
 Toni Sailor – guitar ; production 
 Paul Stone – drums

Additional personnel
 Dave Blair – assistant engineering 
 Nicholas Fowler – additional guitar 
 Martin Giles – mastering
 Robert Harder – production ; mixing 
 Tomi Lahdesmaki – artwork, design
 Steve Lyon – additional production ; mixing 
 Emma Tempest – band photography
 Andy Wright – additional production

Release history

References

2007 debut albums
Sohodolls albums